Nature's Light is the eleventh studio album by the group Blackmore's Night, released on March 12, 2021.

Track listing

Credits
 Ritchie Blackmore - acoustic and electric guitars, hurdy-gurdy, nyckelharpa, mandola
 Candice Night - lead and harmony vocals, woodwinds, tambourine
 Autumn and Rory Blackmore - backing vocals
 Bard David of Larchmont (David Baranowski) - keyboards, backing vocals
 Executive Producer - Ritchie Blackmore
 Assistant Producer / Sound Engineer / Orchestral Arrangements - Pat Regan

Charts

References

2021 albums
Blackmore's Night albums
Albums produced by Ritchie Blackmore
Album chart usages for Czech